Huntington Area Rapid Transit is a bus system exclusively within the Town of Huntington in the state of New York. It began service operations in 1978.  The system is completely separate from Suffolk County Transit.

Fares 
Fares for the buses are $2.25 for adults, $1.25 for students grades K-12, 75 cents for senior citizens (age 60+), individual with disabilities, Medicare card holders, and free for children 44 inches and under. Transfers to other bus routes cost 25 cents, including to buses of the Suffolk County Transit and Nassau Inter-County Express systems.

January 2, 2013 route changes 
HART restructured five former routes prior to the January 2, 2013 changes. Three former fixed routes were restructured. Two weekday peak rail-feeder routes were eliminated because they were underutilized. The new four bus routes gives more direct service, increase coverage area, run exactly the same route in both directions and to increase ridership. HART has restored service in Cold Spring Harbor, Centerport and Northport Harbor areas.

The routes run every 45-50 minute schedule on weekdays and every 90-100 minutes on Saturdays, with none of them running on Sunday. The routes operate from approximately 7:00am to 7:00pm weekdays, and 9:00am to 7:00pm Saturdays.

HART also approved a fare hike to coincide with the January 2, 2013 changes. Previously the adult fare was $1.25, current adult fare as of January 3, 2017 is now $2.25.

Bus routes

Current routes

In accordance with the Americans with Disabilities Act, paratransit service is offered to those unable to utilize traditional buses.

Former Routes

Bus Fleet

Current Fleet

Retired Fleet

References

External links
HART Official Website
HART Bus System Map
Nassau/Suffolk Transit Map (unofficial)
 Town of Huntington Online Library

Surface transportation in Greater New York
Huntington, New York
Bus transportation in New York (state)
Transportation in Suffolk County, New York